Mother and Child is a 2009 drama directed and written by Rodrigo García. It premiered on September 14, 2009, at the 2009 Toronto International Film Festival and at the Sundance Film Festival on January 23, 2010, and was the closing night selection within Maryland Film Festival 2010. It was given a limited release in the United States beginning May 7, 2010.

Plot
When she was 14, Karen became pregnant and gave her daughter up for adoption. The decision to give up her child has always haunted her. Upon meeting laid-back Paco at work, Karen allows her anxiety and mistrust to get the best of her. She gradually calms her anxiety through her growing relationship with Paco, and they get married. Paco persuades Karen to write a letter to her unknown, adult daughter, and she leaves the letter with the Catholic agency that had arranged the adoption.

Karen's daughter, Elizabeth, grows up to be solitary, willful, and hardhearted. She is hired as an attorney at a prestigious law firm headed by Paul. They have an affair, and Elizabeth becomes pregnant. She quits without informing Paul of her condition and moves to a new apartment and a new job. She also leaves a letter for her biological mother with the adoption agency.

Lucy is a baker who longs to be a mother, but she cannot have children of her own. She and her husband, Joseph, contact the same adoption agency and they meet with a young pregnant, prospective mother. After a protracted interview period, the mother agrees to give the couple her baby, but she changes her mind shortly after giving birth. Lucy is devastated by this news. Joseph reveals that he really wants to have his own biological child and he and Lucy separate.

Elizabeth dies while giving birth to her child. Since no one steps forward to claim the baby, the agency offers the baby to Lucy, who adopts her. At first, Lucy is overwhelmed by the demands of being a new mother.

One year later, Karen finds out about Elizabeth's death and her letter, which had been misplaced, informing her that she has a granddaughter named Ella. The agency arranges a meeting and Karen meets the little girl and Lucy, who live a short distance away in her own neighborhood.

Cast

Production
The film was originally going to be produced by Cha Cha Cha Films, Focus Films and Universal Studios; Julie Lynn through Mockingbird Films took over in late 2008 with a production budget of $7 million. Principal photography began in January, 2009.

Reception
The film has been met with generally positive reviews, with critics praising the standout performance of Annette Bening. It has a 78% approval rating based on 130 reviews on Rotten Tomatoes. The site's critics consensus reads, "Though it occasionally veers into unnecessary melodrama, Mother and Child benefits from a stellar cast and writer-director Rodrigo Garcia's finely detailed, bravely unsentimental script." On Metacritic, the film has a weighted average score of 64, indicating "generally favorable reviews."

The film was awarded the Grand Prix du Jury at the 2010 Deauville American Film Festival.

References

External links 
 Official Mother and Child Facebook Page
 
 
 
 

2000s American films
2009 drama films
2000s English-language films
2009 films
2009 independent films
American drama films
Cha Cha Cha Films films
Fictional duos
Films about adoption
Films about interracial romance
Films about mother–daughter relationships
Films directed by Rodrigo García
Films scored by Edward Shearmur
Sony Pictures Classics films